Çaykaya is a village in the Baykan District of Siirt Province in Turkey. The village is populated by Kurds of the Babosî tribe and had a population of 215 in 2021.

The hamlets of Bardaklı, Geçit and Karataş are attached to Çaykaya.

References 

Kurdish settlements in Siirt Province
Villages in Baykan District